The following squads and players competed in the World Women's Handball Championship in 2005 in Russia, Saint Petersburg.

Angola 

 Cristina Branco
 Marta Joaquiem
 Ilda Bengue
 Belina Miguel
 Filomena Trindade
 Bombo Calandula
 Maria Goncalves
 Nair Almeida
 Isabel Fernandes
 Marcelina Kiala
 Maria Pedro
 Anica Neto
 Justina Praca
 Cilizia Tavares
 Elzira Tavares
 Lourdes Monteiro

Coach: Jeronimo Neto

Argentina 

 Maria Celeste Mena
 Melisa Bok
 Maricel Bueno
 Georgina Constantino
 Mariana Sanguinetti
 Magdalena Decilio
 Pilar Romero
 Gisele Leis
 Natacha Melillo
 Bibiana Ferrea
 Cynthia Basile
 Valentina Kogan
 Lucia Fernandez
 Solange Tagliavini
 Patricia Ces
 Maria Emilia Acosta

Coach: Giselle Pintos

Australia 

 Megan Miller
 Shelley Roy
 Olivia Doherty
 Katia Boyd
 Belinda Griffiths
 Lilly Maher
 Katherina Napier
 Raelene Boulton
 Courtney Gahan
 Caitlin Wynne
 Catherine Kent
 Michelle Rossoukas
 Meaghan Gurr
 Kimberly Tennant
 Rosalie Boyd
 Simone Montie

Coach: Geoffrey Latta

Austria 

 Natalia Rusnatchenko
 Ariane Maier
 Ljiljana Paras
 Monika Richter
 Laura Magelinskas
 Sorina Teodorovic
 Marina Budecevic
 Elisabeth Herbst
 Isabel Plach
 Sabrina Thurner
 Petra Blazek
 Katrin Engel
 Tatjana Logvin
 Gabriela Rotis Nagy
 Simona Spiridon
 Katharina Reingruber

Coach: Herbert Müller

Brazil 

 Channa Masson de Souza
 Alexandra do Nascimento
 Fabiana Kuestner
 Silvia Araujo Pinheiro
 Daniela de Oliveira Piedade
 Alessandra Medeiros de Oliveira
 Tayra Rodrigues
 Millene Brune Figueiredo
 Vivianne Rodigues Jacques
 Jacqueline Oliveira Santana
 Lucila da Silva
 Juceli Sales da Rosa
 Aline da Silva
 Idalina Borges Mesquita
 Aline dos Santos
 Francine de Moraes

Coach: Juan Oliver

Cameroon 

 Laurentine Balilumin
 Celestine Nyestok A Ebeng
 Forsuh Perpetua Lemnwie
 Emilienne Ady Dipoko
 Ursula Ngoh Mbah
 Carole Nanda Kouakam
 Nicole Magne Kenmogoe
 Kermine Ngo Kaldjop
 Marthe Virginie Eke Bissono
 Agata Aurore Dooh Soppo Oho
 Evelyne Madjotah Tapfou
 Labelle Kun Nguidjol
 Honoree Kaldjop
 Loualine Shuri Ndeh
 Marguerita Tchagam
 Jacqueline Mossy Solle

Coach: Pascal Teufack

China 

 Liu Guini
 Liu Yun
 Zhang Hongli
 Yu Le
 Huang Dongjie
 Wang Chanchan
 Wang Min
 Wang Shasha
 Zhang Zhiqing
 Huang Hong
 Wu Yanan
 Liu Xiaomei
 Sun Laimiao
 Yu Geli
 Wu Wenjuan
 Li Weiwei

Coach: Kim Gap-soo

Croatia 

 Barbara Stancin
 Miranda Tatari
 Ivanka Hrgovic
 Maja Cop
 Dijana Golubic
 Maida Arslanagic
 Nikica Pusic
 Maja Koznjak
 Jelena Grubisic
 Lidija Horvat
 Svitlana Pasicnik
 Ivana Jelcic
 Marija Popovic
 Kristina Franic
 Ljerka Vresk
 Antonela Pensa

Coach: Ratko Balenovic

Denmark 

 Ditte Andersen
 Jane Wangsöe
 Rikke Nielsen
 Kristina Bille-Hansen
 Mette Sjöberg
 Mette Vestergaard
 Louise Mortensen
 Rikke Hörlykke Jörgensen
 Lene Lund Nielsen
 Karin Mortensen
 Lise Knudsen
 Katrine Fruelund
 Rikke Schmidt
 Lene Thomsen
 Karen Brödsgaard
 Josephine Touray

Coach: Jan Pytlick

France 

 Stéphanie Lambert
 Nina Kamto Njitam
 Amelie Goudjo
 Angelique Spincer
 Paule Baudouin
 Sophie Herbrecht
 Stella Joseph-Matthieu
 Isabelle Wendling
 Myriam Korfanty
 Sabrina Legenty
 Valérie Nicolas
 Sandy Demangeon
 Alissa Gomis
 Christine Vanparys-Torres
 Raphaelle Tervel
 Laurence Maho

Coach: Olivier Krumbholz

Germany

 Sabine Englert
 Clara Woltering
 Alexandra Gräfer
 Anne Müller
 Anna Loerper
 Nadine Krause
 Sabrina Neukamp
 Mariella Bohm
 Silke Meier
 Anja Althaus
 Susanne Henze
 Stefanie Melbeck
 Nina Wörz
 Nora Reiche
 Nadine Härdter
 Grit Jurack

Coach: Armin Emrich

Hungary 

 Katalin Pálinger
 Tímea Sugár
 Beatrix Balogh
 Mónika Kovacsicz
 Ibolya Mehlmann
 Ágnes Hornyák
 Rita Borbás
 Cecília Őri
 Bernadett Ferling
 Anita Görbicz
 Eszter Siti
 Tímea Tóth
 Gabriella Szűcs
 Gabriella Kindl
 Orsolya Vérten
 Fanni Kenyeres

Coach: András Németh

Ivory Coast 

 Rufine Lobouo
 Candido Zazan
 Alimata Dosso
 Elodie Mambo
 Celine Dongo
 Nathalie Kregbo
 Julie Toualy
 Robeace Abogny
 Sandrine Douhou
 Mari Josee Guibi
 Edwige Zadi
 Adeline Koudou
 Laurette Bodua
 Fatoumata Diomande
 Elisabeth Sokouri
 Christiane Guede

Coach: Julienne Mme Akpa

Japan 

 Mami Tanaka
 Yuko Arihama
 Mariko Komatsu
 Mao Higuchi
 Mineko Tanaka
 Natsuki Takei
 Akiko Kinjo
 Hitomi Sakugawa
 Tomoko Sakamoto
 Naomi Nakamura
 Aiko Hayafune
 Kimiko Hida
 Keiko Mizuno
 Noriko Omae
 Hisyao Taniguchi
 Yakari Asai

Coach: Bert Bouwer

Macedonia 

 Olga Kolesnik
 Robertina Mecevska
 Natasa Kocevska
 Anzela Platon Dimovska
 Olga Bujanova
 Klara Boeva
 Valentina Radulovic
 Lence Ilkova
 Alexandra Ristovska
 Semra Radoncik
 Natalija Todorovska
 Julija Portjanko
 Biljana Crvenkoska
 Tanja Andrejeva
 Elena Gjorgjijevska
 Mirjeta Bajramoska

Coach: Andrij Portnoj

Netherlands 

 Marieke van der Wal
 Jokelyn Tienstra
 Debbie Klijn
 Diane Roelofsen
 Saskia Mulder
 Evelien van der Koelen
 Miranda Robben
 Joyce Hilster
 Arjenne Paap
 Andrea Groot
 Diane Lamein
 Natasja Burgers
 Maura Visser
 Irina Pusic
 Silvia Hofman
 Pearl van der Wissel

Coach: Sjors Röttger

Norway 

 Terese Pedersen
 Ragnhild Aamodt
 Anette Hovind Johansen
 Randi Gustad
 Karoline Dyhre Breivang
 Kristine Lunde
 Kari Mette Johansen
 Kjersti Beck
 Linn Jörum Sulland
 Elisabeth Hilmo
 Camilla Thorsen
 Katrine Lunde
 Marianne Rokne
 Tonje Nöstvold
 Isabell Blanco

Coach: Marit Breivik

Poland 

 Sabina Kubisztal
 Iwona Blaszkowska
 Iwona Szafulska
 Joanna Dworaczyk
 Magdalena Milot
 Ewa Damiecka
 Dagmara Kowalska
 Hanna Strzalkowska
 Karolina Siodmiak
 Kinga Polenz
 Iwona Lacz
 Karolina Kudlacz
 Agatha Wypych
 Magdalena Chemicz
 Sabina Wlodek
 Marzena Kot

Coach: Zygfryd Kuchta

Romania 

 Tereza Tamas
 Ramona Maier
 Oana Soit
 Raluca Ivan
 Roxana Gatzel
 Ana Maria Lazer
 Aurelia Bradeanu
 Ionela Gilca
 Paula Radulescu
 Cristina Varzaru
 Steluta Luca
 Valentina Nelli Ardean Elisei
 Luminita Dinu
 Simona Gogirla
 Mihaela Tivadar
 Narcisa Lecusanu

Coach: Gheorghe Tadici

Russia 

 Tatiana Alizar
 Polina Vyakhireva
 Oxana Romenskaya
 Liudmila Postnova
 Anna Kareeva
 Liudmila Bodnieva
 Yana Uskova
 Elena Polenova
 Emilia Turey
 Elena Sergeeva
 Natalia Shipilova
 Maria Sidorova
 Ekaterina Marennikova
 Irina Bliznova
 Anna Kurepta
 Irina Poltoratskaya

Coach: Evgeny Trefilov

Slovenia 

 Urska Wertl
 Nina Potočnik
 Mojca Dercar
 Deja Doler
 Mihaela Ciora
 Mia Bosnjak
 Vesna Pus
 
 Katja Kurent Tatarovac
 Tanja Cigoja
 Sergeja Stefanišin
 Manuela Hrnjic
 Barbara Gorski
 
 Martine Strmsek
 Anja Frešer

Coach: Robert Begus

South Korea 

 Son Min Ji
 Woo Sun Hee
 Huh Soon Young
 Lee Gong Joo
 Song Hai Rim
 Kim Eun Jung
 Kim Cha Youn
 Huh Young Sook
 Moon Kyeong Ha
 Yoo Hyun Ji
 Kim Jin Soon
 Lee Min Hee
 Myoung Bok Hee
 Kang Ji Hey
 Choi Im Jeong
 Moon Pil Hee

Coach: Kang Tae Ko

Ukraine

 Viktoriya Tymoshenkova
 Oksana Sakada
 Tetyana Shynkarenko
 Maryna Vergelyuk
 Olena Iatsenko
 Ganna Siukalo
 Olena Radchenko
 Regina Shymkute
 Iryna Shybanova
 Olena Reznir
 Tetiana Vorozhtsova
 Nataliya Lyapina
 Anastasiya Borodina
 Mariya Boklashchuk
 Maria Makarenko
 Iryna Shutska

Coach: Leonid Ratner

Uruguay 

 Magdalena Gutierrez
 Claudia Porteiro
 Soledad Faedo
 Lucia Miranda
 Eliana Falco
 Paola Lucas
 Fabiana Sencion
 Cecilia Saiz
 Alejandra Sencion
 Ivanna Scavino
 Paula Gambera
 Jussara Castro
 Victoria Grana
 Maria Noel Uriarte
 Alejandra Ferrari
 Ximena Diaz

Coach: Gonzalo Peluffo

References 

World Women's Handball Championship squads
World Handball Championship squads